Kalidas Marg is a road located in Lucknow, Uttar Pradesh in India.

This road is home to official residence of the Chief Minister of Uttar Pradesh, 5, Kalidas Marg.

School
La Martiniere Lucknow Junior Section

References

Roads in Lucknow